The 1937 German Ice Hockey Championship was the 21st season of the German Ice Hockey Championship, the national championship of Germany. Berliner Schlittschuhclub won the championship by defeating SC Riessersee in the final.

First round

Group A

Group B

Group C

Final round

Final

References

External links
German ice hockey standings 1933-1945

Ger
German Ice Hockey Championship seasons
Champ